Muharrem Dalkılıç (born 10 February 1938) is a Turkish middle-distance runner. He competed in the men's 1500 metres at the 1960 Summer Olympics.

References

1938 births
Living people
Athletes (track and field) at the 1960 Summer Olympics
Athletes (track and field) at the 1964 Summer Olympics
Turkish male middle-distance runners
Turkish male long-distance runners
Olympic athletes of Turkey
Sportspeople from Gaziantep
20th-century Turkish people